Paolo Landriani (1757–1839) was an Italian painter and architect.

He was born at Milan, and studied under Gonzaga. He was employed at La Scala theatre, and became reputed as a decorator. He followed especially the principles of Bibiena and Bernardino Galliari. Giovanni Perego and Alessandro Sanquirico were his pupils when he taught at the Brera Academy. Landriani published a history of the principal theaters of Europe. He died at Milan.

His relationship to Paolo Camillo Landriani is unclear.

References

18th-century Italian painters
Italian male painters
19th-century Italian painters
19th-century Italian male artists
Italian scenic designers
Painters from Milan
1737 births
1839 deaths
18th-century Italian male artists